In publishing, a colophon is a brief statement containing information about the publication of a book such as an "imprint" (the place of publication, the publisher, and the date of publication). A colophon may include the device (logo) of a printer or publisher. Colophons are traditionally printed at the ends of books (see History below for the origin of the word), but sometimes the same information appears elsewhere (when it may still be referred to as colophon) and many modern (post-1800) books bear this information on the title page or on the verso of the title-leaf, which is sometimes called a "biblio-page" or (when bearing copyright data) the "copyright-page".

History

The term colophon derives from the Late Latin colophōn, from the Greek κολοφών (meaning "summit" or "finishing touch").

The term colophon was used in 1729 as the bibliographic explication at the end of the book by the English printer Samuel Palmer in his The General History of Printing, from Its first Invention in the City of Mentz to Its first Progress and Propagation thro' the most celebrated Cities in Europe. Thereafter, colophon has been the common designation for the final page that gives details of the  physical creation of the book.

The existence of colophons can be dated back to antiquity. Zetzel, for example, describes an inscription from the 2nd century A.D., transmitted in humanistic manuscripts. He cites the colophon from Poggio's manuscript, a humanist from the 15th century:

Statili(us) / maximus rursum em(en)daui ad tyrone(m) et laecanianu(m) et dom̅ & alios ueteres. III.  (‘I, Statilius Maximus, have for the second time revised the text according to Tiro, Laecanianus, Domitius and three others.’)

A common colophon at the end of hand copied manuscripts was simply "Finished, thank God."

Colophons can be categorized into four groups. Assertive colophons provide the contextual information about the scribe and manuscript. Expressive colophons demonstrate the scribe's feelings and wishes. Directive colophons make the reader do something, and the declarative colophons do something with the reader.

Examples of expressive colophons:

 "I have made an end at last, and my weary hand can rest."
 "Now that I an end have made,  See that what I'm owed is paid."
 "May the writer continue to copy,  and drink good wine." 

Example of directive colophons:

 O beatissime lector, lava manus tuas et sic librum adprehende, leniter folia turna, longe a littera digitos pone.  ("O most gracious reader, wash your hands and touch the book only like this: turn the pages softly and keep your fingers far away from the text".)

Example of declarative colophons:

 Si quis et hunc sancti sumit de culmine galli / Hunc Gallus paulusque simul dent pestibus amplis  ("If anybody takes this book from Gall’s estate, Gall and Paulus together shall inflict the plague upon him".)

The term is also applied to clay tablet inscriptions appended by a scribe to the end of an Ancient Near East (e.g., Early/Middle/Late Babylonian, Assyrian, Canaanite) text such as a chapter, book, manuscript, or record. The colophon usually contained facts relative to the text such as associated person(s) (e.g., the scribe, owner, or commissioner of the tablet), literary contents (e.g., a title, "catch phrases" (repeated phrases), or number of lines), and occasion or purpose of writing. Colophons and catch phrases helped the reader organize and identify various tablets, and keep related tablets together. Positionally, colophons on ancient tablets are comparable to a signature line in modern times. Bibliographically, however, they more closely resemble the imprint page in a modern book.

Examples of colophons in ancient literature may be found in the compilation The Ancient Near East: Supplementary Texts and Pictures Relating to the Old Testament (2nd ed., 1969). Colophons are also found in the Pentateuch, where an understanding of this ancient literary convention illuminates passages that are otherwise unclear or incoherent. Examples are Numbers 3:1, where a later (and incorrect) chapter division makes this verse a heading for the following chapter instead of interpreting it properly as a colophon or summary for the preceding two chapters, and Genesis 37:2a, a colophon that concludes the histories (toledot) of Jacob.

An extensive study of the eleven colophons found in the book of Genesis was done by Percy John Wiseman. Wiseman's study of the Genesis colophons, sometimes described as the Wiseman hypothesis, has a detailed examination of the catch phrases mentioned above that were used in literature of the second millennium B.C. and earlier in tying together the various accounts in a series of tablets.

Printed books

In early printed books the colophon, when present, was a brief description of the printing and publication of the book, giving some or all of the following data: the date of publication, the place of publication or printing (sometimes including the address as well as the city name), the name(s) of the printer(s), and the name(s) of the publisher(s), if different. Sometimes additional information, such as the name of a proofreader or editor, or other more-or-less relevant details, might be added. A colophon might also be emblematic or pictorial rather than in words. The normal position for a colophon was after the explicit (the end of the text, often after any index or register).

Colophons sometimes contained book curses, as this was the one place in a medieval manuscript where a scribe was free to write what he wished. Such curses tend to be unique to each book.

After around 1500 these data were often transferred to the title page, which sometimes existed in parallel with a colophon, so that colophons grew generally less common in the 16th century. 

The statements of printing which appeared (under the terms of the Unlawful Societies Act 1799) on the verso of the title-leaf and final page of each book printed in Great Britain in the 19th century are not, strictly speaking, colophons, and are better referred to as "printers' imprints" or "printer statements".

In some parts of the world, colophons helped fledgling printers and printing companies gain social recognition. For example, in early modern Armenia printers used colophons as a way to gain "prestige power" by getting their name out into the social sphere. The use of colophons in early modern Armenian print culture is significant as well because it signaled the rate of decline in manuscript production and scriptoria use, and conversely the rise and perpetuation of printing for Armenians.

With the development of the private press movement from around 1890, colophons became conventional in private press books, and often included a good deal of additional information on the book, including statements of limitation, data on paper, ink, type, and binding, and other technical details. Some such books include a separate "Note about the type", which will identify the names of the primary typefaces used, provide a brief description of the type's history, and a brief statement about its most identifiable physical characteristics.

Some commercial publishers took up the use of colophons and began to include similar details in their books, either at the end of the text (the traditional position) or on the verso of the title-leaf. Such colophons might identify the book's designer, the software used, the printing method, the printing company, the typeface(s) used in the page design and the kind of ink, paper, and its cotton content. Book publishers Alfred A. Knopf, the Folio Society and O'Reilly Media are notable for their substantial colophons.

Websites
Some web pages also have colophons, which frequently contain (X)HTML, CSS, or usability standards compliance information and links to website validation tests.

See also

Edition notice
Flannel panel
 Indicia
Jerusalem Colophon
Union label and printer's mark
Wiseman hypothesis

References

Sources

Book design
Book terminology
Colophon
Publishing
Scribes
Typography